Big K was a short-lived multi format magazine published by IPC Magazines Ltd during the 1980s.  The design of the magazine was very similar in style to their comic strip publications at the time, 2000ad and Roy of the Rovers and seemed to be aimed squarely at the younger computer user.

The March 1985 issue featured the first episode of the digitally created comic strip Shatter, although as this was the last Big K printed, it was also Shatter's only appearance until a run in Jon Sable: Freelance from issues #25-30 in June 1985.

See also
Computer and Video Games (magazine)
ACE
The Games Machine
Edge
GamesMaster (magazine)

References

External links
Archived Big K Magazines on the Internet Archive

Defunct computer magazines published in the United Kingdom
Video game magazines published in the United Kingdom
Home computer magazines
Magazines established in 1984
Magazines disestablished in 1985
Magazines published in London